Hexisea is a genus of orchids (family Orchidaceae). The genera Costaricaea Schltr. and Euothonaea Rchb.f. are synonyms of Hexisea. This genus is abbreviated Hxsa in trade journals.

Synonymy
At the urging of Dressler, Hexisea has been reduced to synonymy under Scaphyglottis, over which Hexisea has priority.  The Hexisea page is conserved here because Dressler's proposal stated, in part:  "...those who so wish may retain Hexisea in any circumscription that excludes S.  graminifolia (the type of Scaphyglottis; see Dressler in Taxon 9:214. 1960)..."

References

Laeliinae genera
Scaphyglottis